The northern studfish (Fundulus catenatus) is the largest of the killifish and is native to the southcentral United States.

Appearance and anatomy
Northern studfish are sexually dimorphic. Males have horizontal rows of bright orange spots on light blue background and a bright orange tail margin followed by a nearly black band during breeding season. Females are more cryptic colored in shades of beige and olive. Their body shape is elongate and narrow and lacks a lateral line. Northern studfish have spineless fins and both the anal and dorsal fins are large.

Geographic distribution
Upper East Fork White River system, Indiana; upper Salt and Kentucky River drainages, Kentucky; upper Green middle, and lower Cumberland, and Tennessee River drainages, Virginia, Kentucky, Tennessee, Alabama, and Mississippi; West of Mississippi River (primarily Ozark and Ouachita uplands) in central and southern Missouri, southeastern Kansas, eastern Oklahoma and southern Arkansas; southwestern Mississippi in the Mississippi drainage (Coles Creek, Homochitto River, and Buffalo Bayou) and Gulf Slope drainage (Amite River and Pearl River). Live bait buckets and releases of aquarium pets have caused expansion of the native distribution of this species.

Ecology
Northern studfish are egg layers and prefer clear, shallow pools and rocky creeks that have a mixed sand/gravel substrate and constant, sluggish flow.  Males do not build nests but they do stake out a territory and defend it.  Females lay a clutch of 28 to 245 eggs and give no parental care to their young.  Their main diet consists of insects which they skim from the surface of the water but they have also been known to consume snails.

Management
Causes for declining numbers in some areas range from introduction of aggressive non native fish species like the mosquitofish (Gambusia spp.) to anthropogenic loss of water quality and movement from habitat alteration.  Northern studfish require clear water so control of sediment is integral.  Current management practices are to plant riparian zones in order to stabilize the streambanks and control run off from agriculture and construction projects.

References

Further reading
 Fisher, JW. "Ecology of Fundulus catenatus in Three Interconnected Stream Orders." American Journal Midland Naturalist. 106(2): 372-378.
 Lonzarich, David G., ML Warren, Jr., and MR Elger Lonzarich.  "Effects of Habitat Isolation on the Recovery of Fish Assemblages in Experimentally Defaunated Stream Pools in Arkansas. Canadian Journal of Fisheries and Aquatic Sciences. 55(9):2141-2149.

Northern studfish
Freshwater fish of the United States
Endemic fauna of the United States
Fish of the Eastern United States
Fauna of the Plains-Midwest (United States)
Fauna of the Southeastern United States
Taxa named by David Humphreys Storer
Fish described in 1846